Colonel Arnald D. Gabriel (born May 31, 1925, in Cortland, New York) is the former Commander and Conductor of the United States Air Force Band, United States Air Force Symphony Orchestra, and Singing Sergeants from 1964 to 1985. In 1990, he was named the first Conductor Emeritus of the United States Air Force Band and the 29th DIV Band of the Virginia Army National Guard. Gabriel has four sons, one daughter, and thirteen grandchildren.

Early life
During World War II, he served as an infantryman (as a machine gunner) with the US Army's 29th Infantry Division in Europe. For his service in Europe he received two Bronze Star medals and the Combat Infantry Badge.

After leaving the Army, Gabriel worked at a canning factory as he was unable to go to college. Later his former High School Band Director paid for Gabriel to attend Ithaca College in 1946. He earned both Bachelor and Master of Science degrees in Music Education in the Ithaca College.

Gabriel retired from the United States Air Force Band and the Air Force in February 1985.

Career
He has conducted hundreds of major orchestras and bands, including Mormon Tabernacle Choir, Puerto Rico, and Tatui São Paulo (Brazil) symphony orchestras, the Carabiniere Band and the Air Force Band (Italy), the Band of the Royal Netherlands Marines, the Staff Music Corps (Bonn, Germany), the National Band of the Canadian Forces (Ottawa), the National Intercollegiate Band, the Dallas Wind Symphony, the Gamagori Band and the Tokyo Kosei Wind Orchestra (Japan).

Honors
Gabriel's professional honors include the very first Citation of Excellence awarded by the National Band Association, Phi Mu Alpha Sinfonia’s New Millennium Lifetime Achievement Award. He is also a recipient of the Kappa Kappa Psi Distinguished Service to Music Medal.

Gabriel was inducted into the National Band Association Hall of Fame of Distinguished Band Conductors, becoming the youngest person ever to have received this honor. He is also a Past President of the prestigious American Bandmasters Association. In 2008, the US Air Force Band dedicated the Arnald D. Gabriel Hall in his honor.

In 1990, he was named the first Conductor Emeritus of the United States Air Force Band at DAR Constitution Hall in Washington, DC.

Gabriel is a Professor Emeritus of George Mason University.

References

External links
Colonel Gabriel - About

1925 births
Living people
Ithaca College alumni
United States Air Force officers
American male conductors (music)
United States Air Force Band musicians
Distinguished Service to Music Medal recipients
21st-century American conductors (music)
21st-century American male musicians
United States Army personnel of World War II
United States Army soldiers